The coat of arms of Quindío was designed by Solita Lozano de Goméz, who also designed the Flag of the Department of Quindío.

Design and meaning

The Coat of arms of Quindío is the union of two shields, and was based very closely on the Coat of arms of Armenia, the capital of the department.

The biggest is a roundel bordered in gules, and in a field of argent lays an inescutcheon on top of this there's a scroll that contains the motto of the department Young, Rich, Powerful. Below the inescutcheon the year 1966 is inscribed, this being the year Quindío became a department. And going around the sides, are two branches of coffee in representation of the most important product of the region.

The inescutcheon its copied from the inescutcheon of the coat of arms of Armenia. Within it, in a field of azure, there is a trunk with a Splitting Axe encrusted in it, symbol of the colonist who built the town.

Quindio
Quindío Department
Quindío Department
Quindío Department
Quindío Department